This is the results breakdown of the local elections held in Castile and León on 26 May 1991. The following tables show detailed results in the autonomous community's most populous municipalities, sorted alphabetically.

Overall

City control
The following table lists party control in the most populous municipalities, including provincial capitals (shown in bold). Gains for a party are displayed with the cell's background shaded in that party's colour.

Municipalities

Ávila
Population: 46,992

Burgos
Population: 163,507

León
Population: 137,758

Palencia
Population: 77,464

Ponferrada
Population: 60,401

Salamanca
Population: 162,037

Segovia
Population: 55,188

Soria
Population: 32,609

Valladolid
Population: 333,680

Zamora
Population: 63,436

See also
1991 Castilian-Leonese regional election

References

Castile and León
1991